Plzeňský Prazdroj, a. s., known in English as the Pilsner Urquell Brewery, is a Czech brewery opened in 1842 and headquartered in Plzeň, Czech Republic. It was the first brewery to produce pale lager, branded as Pilsner Urquell, which became so popular and was so much copied that more than two-thirds of the beer produced in the world today is pale lager, sometimes named pils, pilsner and pilsener after Pilsner Urquell. The brewery name, Pilsner Urquell, which can be roughly translated into English as "the original source at Pilsen", was adopted as a trademark in 1898.  Pilsner Urquell is the largest producer and exporter of beer in the Czech Republic.

The brewery was part of the SABMiller group of companies (at first South African Breweries) from 1999 to 2017. As part of the agreements made with regulators before Anheuser-Busch InBev was allowed to acquire SABMiller in October 2016, Pilsner Urquell (excluding certain geographical areas) was sold to Japan-based Asahi Breweries in March 2017.

History 

The first beer was brewed here in 1842 by Bavarian brewer Josef Groll. In 1859, “Pilsner Bier” was registered as a brand name at the local Chamber of Commerce and Trade. In 1869, a competitor was founded as a joint stock company, later known as Gambrinus. In 1898 the German trademark Urquell and Czech trademark Prazdroj were created, to underline the claim of being the older, original source of Pilsner beer. In 1932 Měšťanský pivovar merged with Plzeňské akciové pivovary. In 1946, the brewery was nationalized under the name Plzeňské pivovary (Pilsen breweries).

After the fall of communism in late 1989, the brewery was turned into a public share company, then renamed in 1994 after the Czech name of their famous beer, Plzeňský Prazdroj. In 1999, they started to merge with  Pivovar Radegast a.s. and Pivovar Velké Popovice a. s..

The brewery has been the largest exporter of beer produced in the Czech Republic since 2000 when production surpassed that of Budějovický Budvar.

Timeline

Pilsner Urquell has been brewed in the same brewery using the same recipe and traditional methods, like triple decoction and parallel brewing in wooden lagering barrels for over 175 years. 
 1295 City of Pilsen established, beginnings of brewing.
 1307 First recorded mention of the existence of an actual brewery with malt house.
 1839 Burghers in Pilsen decide to found the Burgess' Brewery (Bürgerbrauerei, Měšťanský pivovar).
 15 September 1839 – autumn 1840 Construction of the Burgess' Brewery, forerunner of today's brewery.
 5 October 1842 First brew of Bavarian type beer, bottom-fermented beer, so-called pale lager.
 1 March 1859 "Pilsner Bier" brand name registered at the Chamber of Commerce and Trade in Pilsen.
 2nd half of 19th century Brewery expands in Europe, first exports from Pilsen to America.
 1869 Competitor founded as First Stock Brewery (První akciový pivovar), today known as Gambrinus.
 1898 New Urquell - Prazdroj trade mark created.
 1910 Světovar - Český Plzeňský pivovar akciové společnosti v Plzni.
 1913 Output over 100 million litres of beer, commercial representation in 34 countries.
 1925 - 1933 Merger of several Pilsen breweries.
 1933 Two breweries remain in Pilsen: Měšťanský pivovar and Plzeňské akciové pivovary (PAP), with the majority of PAP shares being owned by Měšťanský pivovar.
 1 June 1945 National administration for companies owned by Měšťanský pivovar in Pilsen . National administration took over management of the Měšťanský pivovar (afterwards known as Prazdroj) and PAP (Gambrinus).
 13 September 1946 Nationalization of both breweries and creation of a single national company, Plzeňské pivovary.
 1 Jun 1964 Formation of the company Západočeské pivovary with registered office in Pilsen. Creation of the national company Plzeňský Prazdroj with regard to ownership of trademarks and contact with customers abroad.
 November 1989 Fundamental changes initiated for the company's entire organisation.
 1 May 1992 Following privatization the joint stock company Plzeňské pivovary, a.s. is established. Major investment, technological development, rise in output and exports, development of business and distribution network, marketing.
 1994 Formation of joint stock company Plzeňský Prazdroj.
 1999 Merger approved with the companies Pivovar RADEGAST a. s., and Pivovar Velké Popovice a. s.
 1999 Plzeňský Prazdroj, a. s. becomes part of South African Breweries, subsequently called SABMiller.
 Apr 2002 Pilsner Urquell was voted beer of the year at the Helsinki Beer Festival.
 30 September 2002 merger completed with the companies Pivovar RADEGAST a. s., and Pivovar Velké Popovice a. s. This resulted in the formation of a single joint stock company called Plzeňský Prazdroj, a. s.
 21 December 2016, agreement of sale to Asahi Group Holdings was concluded in March 2017.

Products 

 Pilsner Urquell, pale lager and flagship of the brand, has created new category of beer (Pilsner, Pils), contains 4.4% ABV (in Czech: 11° or Ležák).
 Gambrinus Original, a pale draught beer with 4.3% ABV (in Czech: 10° or Výčepní).
 Gambrinus Plná, a pale lager with 5.2% ABV (in Czech: 12° or Ležák).
 Gambrinus Unpasteurized 10°, an unpasteurized draught beer with 4.3% ABV (in Czech: Nepasterizovaná 10°).
 Gambrinus Unpasteurized 12°, an unpasteurized pale lager with 5.0% ABV (in Czech: Nepasterizovaná 12°).
 Gambrinus Unfiltered, an unfiltered yeast pale lager with 4.95% ABV (in Czech: Nefiltrované).
 Velkopopovický Kozel
 Radegast
 Birell, a non-alcoholic beer
 Excelent (beer)
 Frisco, a flavored cider
 Kingswood Cider
 Master, beer specialties
 Kopparberg Cider
 Klasik (beer)
 Primus (beer)

Gallery

Museum 

A brewery museum ("Pivovarské muzeum") has been set up near the brewery in the authentic medieval brewing house with malt house, which has been declared a cultural monument. It includes the late Gothic malt house, kiln, original drying shed and two-level laying-down cellars with ice-cellar, which are hewn from the Pilsen substrata. The exhibition covers Pilsen's most ancient history, the development of crafts, the emergence and growth of the guilds, the beginnings and development of brewing, malting, the craft of cooper, haulage and catering.

The tour includes a replica of a pub from the turn of the 19th and 20th centuries and a laboratory from the second half of the 19th century. The city walls have been opened with an example of the cultivation of barley and hops.

The museum has become an anchor for the European Route of Industrial Heritage.

Pilsner Fest
Pilsner Fest is a two-day beer festival held each year by the brewery, with music by local bands on four stages in the town.

See also 
 Budweiser
 Budweiser Bürgerbräu (since 1795)
 Budějovický Budvar (since 1895)
 Beer in the Czech Republic
 Frisco (soft drink) - product by Pilsner
Pilsen Fest

References

External links

 www.prazdroj.cz — the company web site
 the museum website
 Pilsner Urquell — article at the University of West Bohemia website
 Plzensky Prazdroj (SABMiller) — at RateBeer website
 The Plzeňský Prazdroj brewery — panoramic pictures of the brewery
 
 
 

Breweries in the Czech Republic
Companies of Czechoslovakia
Buildings and structures in Plzeň
SABMiller
Asahi Breweries